Paavo Veikko Toivari (11 January 1917 – 11 February 2010) was a Finnish middle-distance runner. He competed in the men's 3000 metres steeplechase at the 1948 Summer Olympics.

References

1917 births
2010 deaths
Athletes (track and field) at the 1948 Summer Olympics
Finnish male middle-distance runners
Finnish male steeplechase runners
Olympic athletes of Finland
Place of birth missing